Simone Forlani (born 1 August 1974) is an Italian lightweight rower. He won a gold medal at the 1999 World Rowing Championships in St. Catharines with the lightweight men's quadruple scull.

References

1974 births
Living people
Italian male rowers
World Rowing Championships medalists for Italy